The Karbi language is spoken by the Karbi (also known as Mikir or Arleng) people of Northeastern India. 

It belongs to the Sino-Tibetan language family, but its position is unclear. Grierson (1903) classified it under Naga languages, Shafer (1974) and Bradley (1997) classify the Mikir languages as an aberrant Kuki-Chin branch, but Thurgood (2003) leaves them unclassified within Sino-Tibetan. Blench and Post (2013) classify it as one of the most basal languages of the entire family.

History
Like most languages of Northeast India, Karbi writing system is based on Roman script, occasionally in Assamese script. The earliest written texts in Karbi were produced by Christian missionaries, in Roman script, especially by the American Baptist Mission and the Catholic Church. The missionaries brought out a newspaper in Karbi titled Birta in the year 1903, Rev. R.E. Neighbor's  'Vocabulary of English and Mikir, with Illustrative Sentences'  published in 1878, which can be called the first Karbi dictionary. Sardoka Perrin Kay's  'English–Mikir Dictionary'  published in 1904, Sir Charles Lyall and Edward Stack's The Mikirs in 1908, the first ethnographic details on the Karbis and G.D. Walker's  'A Dictionary of the Mikir Language'  published in 1925 are some of the earliest known books on the Karbis and the Karbi language and grammar.

The Karbis have a rich oral tradition. The Mosera (recalling the past), a lengthy folk narrative that describes the origin and migration ordeal of the Karbis, is one such example.

Varieties
There is little dialect diversity except for the Dumurali / Kamrup Karbi dialect, which is distinct enough to be considered a separate Karbi language.

Konnerth (2014) identifies two main Karbi varieties.

Hills Karbi: Rongkhang or Ronghang dialect of  Karbi Anglong, West Karbi Anglong district, Assam
Plains Karbi (Dumra Karbi): spoken in Kamrup district and Marigaon district, Assam, and in Ri-Bhoi district, Meghalaya.

Phonology
Data below are from Konnerth (2017).

Consonants

Initial consonants

 Palatal /ɟ~j/ constitutes free variation between a stop and a glide production.
 Also, allophonic alternations typical for the area include /pʰ~ɸ/ (within the same speaker) and /r~ɾ~ɹ/ (intergenerational and interdialectal).

Final consonants

Vowels

Syllable structure
Karbi syllables may be the open (C)(C)V(V) or the closed (C)(C)VC. Possible onset consonant cluster combinations are as follows: .

Geographical distribution

India
Karbi is spoken in the following areas of Northeast India (Ethnologue).

Assam:
Darrang district
Dima Hasao district (formerly North Cachar district)
East Kamrup district
Hojai district
Kamrup Metropolitan district
Karbi Anglong district
Lakhimpur district
Marigaon district
Nagaon district
Sonitpur district
Biswanath district
Lakhimpur district
South Kamrup district
West Karbi Anglong district
Arunachal Pradesh:
Papum Pare district (Balijan circle)
Meghalaya:
East Khasi Hills district
Jaintia Hills district
Ri-Bhoi district
West Khasi Hills district
Nagaland:
foothills around Dimapur

Bangladesh
An estimate 1500 Karbi live in Bangladesh.

See also
 Karbi script

Notes

References

 
 

Kuki-Chin–Naga languages
Languages of Assam
Languages of Arunachal Pradesh
Languages of Meghalaya
Endangered languages of India
Endangered Sino-Tibetan languages